David Calderisi (born 21 June 1940) is a Canadian actor with a career in both Canada and the United Kingdom.

Early life and education 

Calderisi was born in Montreal and attended McGill University.

Career 
After training as an actor in London from 1959 to 1962, Calderisi made appearances in iconic British TV shows including The Saint, The Count of Monte Cristo, The Baron, Doctor Who (serial: The Mind of Evil) and The Protectors.

At the same time, he collaborated with David Halliwell to revolutionize British theatre by bringing lunchtime performances to the masses. They formed the company Quipu which from 1968 to 1973 operated at three venues: London Academy of Music and Dramatic Art (LAMDA, where Calderisi studied for the stage), the Mercury Theatre, Colchester and the Little Theatre in Central London, off St. Martin's Lane. Calderisi has also acted and directed in theatres across the West End in productions such as The Experiment and The Theatre of Death written by Philip Martin.

Returning to Canada in 1971, Calderisi had appearances in The Littlest Hobo, War of the Worlds, Due South, Kung Fu: The Legend Continues and Hannibal amongst others, as well as the recurring role of Barry Calvert in Earth: Final Conflict. Theatre work includes playing Frankenstein's monster on stage in Montreal as well as a one-man show performance of Rubaiyat of Omar Khayyam, translated by poet Edward FitzGerald.

As a teacher, Calderisi has taught and directed at Centre for Indigenous Theatre, National Theatre School of Canada and York University as well as colleges George Brown, Humber and Sheridan.

Filmography

Film

Television

References

External links 
 
David Calderisi at Theatricalia

1940 births
Living people
Canadian male stage actors
Canadian male television actors
Canadian male voice actors
Alumni of the London Academy of Music and Dramatic Art